Venanzio Ortis (born 29 January 1955) is an Italian retired long-distance runner who won two medals at the 1978 European Championships.

Biography
Ortis was born in Paluzza, province of Udine. He started racing in 1969 (for a period he also practiced cross-country skiing), and later won the Italian junior titles in the 1000 and 3000 m races. On 16 August 1978, aged 23, he set a new Italian record in the 5000 m at the Weltklasse Zürich, obtaining a third place behind  Henry Rono and Markus Ryffel. In the fast 10,000-metre race of the 1978 European Athletics Championships, held in Prague two weeks later, he broke 28 minutes for the first time while finishing second in 27 minutes 31.48 seconds, just four one-hundredths of a second ahead of  Aleksandr Antipov of the Soviet Union, and half a second behind Finland's Martti Vainio (see, for example, Tapio Pekola et al., eds., EM-Praha 1978 (European Championships in Prague 1978), Kaarina, Finland:  Juoksija-lehti (Runner Magazine), 1978).  In the slow and tactical 5,000-metre final, he managed to squeeze through the narrow space between Ryffel and the Soviet Union's Aleksandr Fedotkin to sprint to the lead and win by 0.1 seconds.  He missed the 1980 Moscow Olympics due to injury. His last major international track race was the 1981 IAAF World Cup event in Rome, where he placed fourth in 10,000. Plagued by physical problems, Ortis retired in 1983.

He is the cousin of the Italian cross-country skier Manuela Di Centa.

Achievements

National titles
He won five times the national championships at senior level.

Italian Athletics Championships
5000 metres: 1977
10,000 metres: 1976, 1978
Cross country (12 km): 1980
Italian Athletics Indoor Championships
3000 metres: 1978

See also
 FIDAL Hall of Fame

References

External links
 

1955 births
Living people
People from the Province of Udine
Italian male cross country runners
Italian male long-distance runners
Athletes (track and field) at the 1976 Summer Olympics
Olympic athletes of Italy
European Athletics Championships medalists
Athletics competitors of Fiamme Oro
Mediterranean Games silver medalists for Italy
Athletes (track and field) at the 1987 Mediterranean Games
Mediterranean Games medalists in athletics
Sportspeople from Friuli-Venezia Giulia